Lerp or LERP may refer to:

 Lerp (biology), a structure produced by larvae of psyllid insects as a protective cover
 Linear interpolation (Lerp), a method of curve fitting in mathematics
 Emil Lerp (1886-1966), German inventor of first gasoline transportable chainsaw
 Liberia Equal Rights Party
 Lyari Expressway Resettlement Project